is former Japanese rugby union player who played as a wing or fly half, and captained the national team between 2012 and 2013.

After becoming a regular starter for Toshiba Brave Lupus in the Top League, Hirose made his debut for Japan in 2007 against Hong Kong at fly-half scoring 2 tries, but never featured again under coach John Kirwan. He continued to be a key player at domestic level though, captaining Toshiba Brave Lupus to back to back Top League victories in 2009 and 2010.

In 2012, 5 years from his debut, he was recalled and named captain of the Japan national rugby union team by new coach, Eddie Jones. He was also infamously on the receiving end of a rant by Jones after a loss to the French Barbarians in June.

From there onwards he became a bit part player at international level with his remaining caps all coming off the bench as a utility player who could cover both fly-half and wing.

He was retained for the 2015 Rugby World Cup, with his leadership skills praised by Jones, but was the only player in the 31 man squad not to make the field in the tournament, and following a final season with Toshiba Brave Lupus decided to retire.

References

External links
Toshiba Brave Lupus wing profiles

1981 births
Living people
Japanese rugby union players
Toshiba Brave Lupus Tokyo players
Rugby union wings
Japan international rugby union players